Inter-Allied Victory Medal may refer to:

 Inter-Allied Victory Medal (Belgium)
 Inter-Allied Victory Medal (Greece)
1914–1918 Inter-Allied Victory medal (France)